Therippia triloba is a species of beetle in the family Cerambycidae. It was described by Francis Polkinghorne Pascoe in 1859, originally under the genus Cacia.

References

Mesosini
Beetles described in 1859